Spizaetus is the typical hawk-eagle birds of prey genus found in the tropics of the Americas. It was however used to indicate a group of tropical eagles that included species occurring in southern and southeastern Asia and one representative of this genus in the rainforests of West Africa. The Old World species have been separated into the genus Nisaetus. Several species have a prominent head crest.

The American Ornithologists' Union merges Spizastur into Spizaetus since 2007.

Spizaetus eagles are forest birds with several species having a preference for highland woodlands. They build stick nests in trees. The sexes are similarly plumaged with typical raptor brown upperparts and pale underparts, but young birds are distinguishable from adults, often by a whiter head.

These eagles eat medium-sized vertebrate prey such as mammals, birds and reptiles.

The species that were historically placed in this genus are:

New World species retained in Spizaetus

Old World species now moved to Nisaetus
 Flores hawk-eagle Nisaetus floris (earlier Spizaetus cirrhatus floris or Spizaetus floris)
 Mountain hawk-eagle, Nisaetus nipalensis (earlier Spizaetus nipalensis)
 The Western Ghats and Sri Lankan race has been suggested as a full species Nisaetus kelaarti.
 Blyth's hawk-eagle, Nisaetus alboniger (earlier Spizaetus alboniger)
 Javan hawk-eagle, Nisaetus bartelsi (earlier Spizaetus bartelsi)
 Sulawesi hawk-eagle, Nisaetus lanceolatus (earlier Spizaetus lanceolatus)
 (Northern) Philippine hawk-eagle, Nisaetus philippensis (earlier Spizaetus philippensis)
 Southern Philippine hawk-eagle, Nisaetus pinskeri (earlier Spizaetus (philippensis) pinskeri)
 Wallace's hawk-eagle, Nisaetus nanus (earlier Spizaetus nanus)
Moved to Aquila
 Cassin's hawk-eagle, Aquila africana (earlier Spizaetus africanus)

Footnotes

References
 Banks, Richard C.; Chesser, R. Terry; Cicero, Carla; Dunn, Jon L.; Kratter, Andrew W.; Lovette, Irby J.; Rasmussen, Pamela C.; Remsen, J.V. Jr; Rising, James D. & Stotz, Douglas F. (2007): Forty-eighth Supplement to the American Ornithologists’ Union Check-List of North American Birds. Auk 124(3): 1109–1115. DOI:10.1642/0004-8038(2007)124[1109:FSTTAO]2.0.CO;2 PDF fulltext
 Barlow, Clive (1997): A field guide to birds of The Gambia and Senegal. Pica Press, Nr. Robertsbridge (East Sussex). 
 ffrench, Richard; O'Neill, John Patton & Eckelberry, Don R. (1991): A guide to the birds of Trinidad and Tobago (2nd edition). Comstock Publishing, Ithaca, N.Y.. 
 Gamauf, Anita; Gjershaug, Jan-Ove; Røv, Nils; Kvaløy, Kirsti & Haring, Elisabeth (2005): Species or subspecies? The dilemma of taxonomic ranking of some South-East Asian hawk-eagles (genus Spizaetus). Bird Conservation International 15(1): 99–117.  (HTML abstract)
 Haring E., Kvaloy, K., Gjershaug, J.-O., Rov, N., Gamauf A. (2007): Convergent evolution and paraphyly of the hawk-eagles of the genus Spizaetus (Aves, Accipitridae) - phylogenetic analyses based on mitochondrial markers. J. Zool. Syst. Evol. Research 45: 353–365. PDF
 Grimmett, Richard; Inskipp, Carol, Inskipp, Tim & Byers, Clive (1999): Birds of India, Pakistan, Nepal, Bangladesh, Bhutan, Sri Lanka, and the Maldives. Princeton University Press, Princeton, N.J.. 
 Hilty, Steven L. (2003): Birds of Venezuela. Christopher Helm, London. 
 Stiles, F. Gary & Skutch, Alexander Frank (1989): A guide to the birds of Costa Rica. Comistock, Ithaca.

External link
 

 
Bird genera
Eagles

Higher-level bird taxa restricted to the Neotropics
Taxa named by Louis Jean Pierre Vieillot